Sanduleak may refer to:
 Nicholas Sanduleak, an American astronomer
 9403 Sanduleak, a minor planet
 Sanduleak -69° 202, a blue supergiant that went supernova in 1987